Sir John Redvers Freeland  (16 July 1927 – 29 June 2014) was a British diplomat and international lawyer.

Early life
Freeland was born on 16 July 1927 in Hendon, London to Clarence Redvers Freeland and Freda Freeland ( Walker). He was educated at Stowe School and at Corpus Christi College, Cambridge. He married Sarah Hayward in 1952.

Career
Freeland was appointed Companion of the Order of St Michael and St George (CMG) in 1973. He was the Legal Adviser to the Foreign and Commonwealth Office from 1984 to 1987. He became a Bencher of Lincoln's Inn in 1985. He took silk as Queen's Counsel in 1987. He was appointed as Judge of the European Court of Human Rights in respect of the United Kingdom on 23 April 1991. He was re-elected as Judge on 4 January 1992, and relinquished office along with every other judge of the court upon the entry into force of Protocol 11 of the European Convention on Human Rights on 1 November 1998.

Death
Freeland died on 29 June 2014. He was survived by his wife, son, and daughter.

References

1927 births
2014 deaths
Alumni of Corpus Christi College, Cambridge
People educated at Stowe School
Judges of the European Court of Human Rights
Members of Lincoln's Inn
Knights Commander of the Order of St Michael and St George
English King's Counsel
Members of the Middle Temple